is a Japanese football player for Artista Asama.

Club statistics
Updated to end of 2018 season.

References

External links
Profile at Ehime FC

1984 births
Living people
Kibi International University alumni
People from Uwajima, Ehime
Association football people from Ehime Prefecture
Japanese footballers
J2 League players
Japan Football League players
Fagiano Okayama players
Matsumoto Yamaga FC players
Ehime FC players
Artista Asama players
Association football defenders